Cotterell Township is one of fourteen townships in Dodge County, Nebraska, United States. The population was 400 at the 2000 census. A 2006 estimate placed the township's population at 391.

See also
 County government in Nebraska

References

External links
 City-Data.com

Townships in Dodge County, Nebraska
Townships in Nebraska